Just Friends, billed as Stockard Channing in Just Friends on the title card, is an American sitcom television series that aired on CBS from March 4, 1979 to June 24, 1979.

Stockard Channing, an accomplished stage actress who had entered the national consciousness with her role as Betty Rizzo in Grease a year prior, was the lead. Gerrit Graham, Mimi Kennedy, Lou Crisculo and Sydney Goldsmith co-starred with her on the series.

A year after Just Friends had ended, Channing starred in her self-titled The Stockard Channing Show. Ostensibly, the two series were set in different fictional universes with different character names but were largely identical in premise, with an identical home set, with Channing speaking in interviews as if the two shows were two seasons of the same series.

Plot
This series revolves around health spa assistant manager Susan Hughes, whose marriage is falling apart.

Cast
Stockard Channing as Susan Hughes
Gerrit Graham as Leonard Scribner
Mimi Kennedy as Victoria Chasen
Lou Crisculo as Milt D'Angelo
Sydney Goldsmith as Coral
Joan Tolentino as Mrs. Fischer
Albert Insinnia as Angelo D'Angelo
Liz Torres as Miranda D'Angelo
Rhonda Foxx as Mrs. Blanchard
Linda Rose as Miss Yarnell

Production
The pilot for Just Friends was videotaped before a live studio audience at CBS Television City in Hollywood in November 1978. Production relocated to the Goldenwest Videotape Division also in Hollywood for the rest of the series. The series ranked 26th for the season with an average household share of 20.2.

The following season, The Stockard Channing Show replaced Just Friends.

Episodes

DVD release
10 of the 13 episodes of Just Friends were released on DVD in 2006 by the Canadian company Visual Entertainment as part of the DVD set of Channing's following series, The Stockard Channing Show.

References

External links

1979 American television series debuts
1979 American television series endings
1970s American sitcoms
CBS original programming
English-language television shows
Television shows set in Los Angeles